Eric Mackenzie Robertson (12 September 1892 – 28 July 1975) was a Newfoundland marathoner, who competed at the 1920 Summer Olympics in Antwerp, Belgium for Great Britain. He was born in St. John's, Newfoundland.

After the war he settled in London. While working in a clothing store some of his co-workers were members of the Polytechnic Harriers, and through them he developed his love of running. In 1920, he travelled to Antwerp to cheer on his teammates from the Harriers, who were members of the British team. However, the British team was short one person and his teammates convinced their coach to let Robertson run in the marathon. His inexperience showed as he finished in last place, 35 minutes behind the second to last place finisher.

References

External links
 

1892 births
1975 deaths
Newfoundland Colony people
Newfoundland military personnel of World War I
Olympic athletes of Great Britain
British male long-distance runners
Canadian male long-distance runners
Sportspeople from St. John's, Newfoundland and Labrador
Athletes (track and field) at the 1920 Summer Olympics
Royal Newfoundland Regiment soldiers
Emigrants from the Dominion of Newfoundland to the United Kingdom